Toumba (Greek: Τούμπα) is a district in eastern Thessaloniki, Greece. It is densely built-up and is divided into Ano Toumba and Kato Toumba (Upper and Lower Toumba) by a flume, and it is part of 4th Division of Thessaloniki Municipality. 

In archaeology the term Toumba stands for the mounds created by prehistoric settlements. They were mistaken for barrows, hence the name that is derived from the word Tomb, but excavations show that they are tells. The mound that rises in the area gave the neighbourhood its name.

The archaeological site
The archaeological site consists of a) of a steep-sided mound or tell ('Toumba' in Modern Greek) and b) a low table (Trapeza) spreading around its base. Both toumba and table are the product of centuries of human habitation as debris layers built up with the passage of time. The Toumba was occupied principally during the Bronze and Early Iron Ages (3000-700 BC, while the Table was occupied from the Early Iron Age through the Archaic, Classical and Hellenistic periods (c 800-200 BC). This community might be identified as Ancient Therma or part of it. Therma, along with 25 other villages, was united by Cassander, in order to form Thessaloniki in 315 BC (Stravon VII 21 & 24).

The excavations are still in progress, conducted by the Aristotle University of Thessaloniki (on the Toumba) and the Greek Archaeological Service (on the Table). Both excavations have made and continue to make important contributions to understanding the nature of human activity in the prehistoric and early historic periods in Central Macedonia and the Thermaic Gulf.

Modern district 
The modern district of Toumba was created mostly by Greek refugees from Asia Minor and Constantinople after 1922, as in the area there were mostly fields and few houses until their coming. Musician Nikos Papazoglou lived in this district.

A massive constructive development in the area took place during the late 1970s and 1980s.

Sports clubs

PAOK FC Stadium 
The Toumba neighborhood hosts the home stadium of PAOK FC, which bears the same name, Toumba Stadium.

Streets 
 Botsari Street
 Lambraki Street
 Mikras Asias Street
 Papafi Street
 Vosporou Street
 Anatolikis Thrakis Street
 Agias Marinas Street
 Amfipoleos Street
 Perraivou Street
 Lesvou Street
 Pylaias Street
 Artakis Street 
 Kleanthous Street

References

External links
Urbanism in the Aegean Bronze Age by Keith Branigan
Geometric Greece: 900-700 BC by John Nicolas Coldstream
Archaeology of burial mound at Toumba(Toumba at Lefkandi in Euboea).

Populated places in Thessaloniki (regional unit)
Mycenaean sites in Macedonia (Greece)
Iron Age sites in Greece